The 1995 Skoda Grand Prix was a professional ranking snooker tournament that took place between 16–29 October 1995 at the Crowtree Centre in Sunderland, England.

Stephen Hendry defeated defending champion John Higgins 9–5 in a rather scrappy final.


Prize fund
The breakdown of prize money for this year is shown below:

Winner: £60,000
Runner up: £32,000
Semi-finalists: £16,000
Quarter-finalists: £9,050
Last 16: £4,550
Last 32: £2,600
Last 64: £1,900

Stage one High Break: £3,600
Stage two High Break: £5,000

Total: £330,000

Main draw

Top half

Bottom half

Final

Century breaks

Qualifying stage centuries
140  Sam Chong

Televised stage centuries
138, 129, 112, 103, 102  Stephen Hendry
131, 124, 101  John Higgins
128  Tony Drago
124, 123  Anthony Hamilton
115  Martin Clark
115  Alan McManus
109  Willie Thorne
105, 104, 100  Jimmy White
105  Mark Davis
104, 100  Joe Swail
102  Steve Davis
102  Ronnie O'Sullivan
101  Steve James

References

1995
Grand Prix
Grand Prix (snooker)
Grand Prix